Cimolichthys is an extinct genus of 1.5- to 2.0-meter-long nektonic predatory aulopiformid fish.

Description
Although the closest living relatives of Cimolichthys are lancetfish and lizardfish, the living animals would have resembled very large freshwater pikes. Their bodies were covered by large, heavy scutes. Typical of this species are narrow lower jaws with several series of teeth. Remains of undigested fishes or squids have been found in collected specimens. They lived in the Late Cretaceous period, from the Cenomanian age (99.6 ± 0.9 Mya and 93.5 ± 0.8 Mya) to the Maastrichtian age (70.6 ± 0.6 Mya to 66 Mya).

Distribution
Fossils of Cimolichthys are found in Cretaceous strata of North America (Canada and United States) and Europe.

Gallery

References

Sepkoski, Jack Sepkoski's Online Genus Database

Aulopiformes
Cretaceous bony fish
Prehistoric ray-finned fish genera
Late Cretaceous fish of North America
Mooreville Chalk
Fossil taxa described in 1857
Taxa named by Joseph Leidy